Karl Klasen (23 April 1909 – 22 April 1991) was a German jurist and served as president of the Bundesbank from 1970 to 1977. He was co-head of Deutsche Bank from 1967 to 1969.

1909 births
1991 deaths
Jurists from Hamburg
German bankers
Presidents of the Deutsche Bundesbank
Grand Crosses 1st class of the Order of Merit of the Federal Republic of Germany